Carlos Chaurand Arzate (born 7 July 1951) is a Mexican lawyer and politician affiliated with the Institutional Revolutionary Party. As of 2014 he served as Senator of the LVIII and LIX Legislatures of the Mexican Congress representing Guanajuato and as Deputy of the LX Legislature.

References

1951 births
Living people
Politicians from Guanajuato
20th-century Mexican lawyers
Members of the Senate of the Republic (Mexico)
Members of the Chamber of Deputies (Mexico)
Institutional Revolutionary Party politicians
People from Celaya
21st-century Mexican politicians
21st-century Mexican lawyers